Mark Hamilton (born April 21, 1956) is an American politician who served in the Georgia House of Representatives from 2007 to 2015.

References

1956 births
Living people
Republican Party members of the Georgia House of Representatives